Ouazzane (also Ouezzane) (Berber: ⵡⴰⵣⵣⴰⵏ) is a town in northern Morocco, with a population of 59,606 recorded in the 2014 Moroccan census.

The city is well known in Morocco and throughout the Islamic world as a spiritual capital for it was home for several pillars of Sufism.  It has been known also as "Dar Dmana" ("House of Safety") due to its containing the tomb of the 18th-century Idrisi Sharif.

Many Jews of Morocco consider Ouazzane to be a holy city and make pilgrimages there to venerate the tomb of several marabouts (Moroccan saints), particularly moul Anrhaz, the local name for Rabbi Amram ben Diwan, an eighteenth-century rabbi who lived in the city and whose burial site is associated with a number of miracles.

During the Rif rebellion (leader Abd el Krim) in 1925 -1926, Ouazzane was an important supply base for the French Army. Ouazzane was connected by a 600 mm gauge narrow gauge railway via Ain Dfali, Mechra Bel Ksiri to Port Lyautey, now Kenitra, forming part of the 1912–1914 French built extensive narrow gauge network of Chemins de fer Militaires du Maroc, the largest 600 mm gauge network that ever existed in Africa with a total length of more than 1702 kilometres.

References

External links 
 Lexicorient

Jewish pilgrimage sites
Populated places in Ouezzane Province
Provincial capitals in Morocco
Morocco geography articles needing translation from French Wikipedia